RFNS Kula (201) is a Pacific Forum patrol boat operated by Fiji. She was designed and built by Australia. Australia also provided training and infrastructure.

Operational history

On June 27, 1994, Kula undertook her first search and rescue expedition, eventually finding and rescuing two young girls from Vanuatu whose punt had gone adrift.  The weather was bad and visibility was poor when she arrived at the search site over twelve hours later, and her commander, Viliame Nauputo, requested the assistance of a French Navy aircraft, from Noumea.

In 2004 armed crew-members boarded and captured a pirate fishing vessel.

In June 2017 Kula rescued four New Zealand businessmen when their yacht was wrecked in Fiji waters.

Although Australia designed the vessels using commercial off-the-shelf, so smaller countries, like Fiji, would find them easier to maintain, Fiji found the vessels hard to maintain, and there were periods that only Kula remained operational.

A decommissioning ceremony was held on December 22, 2019, prior to Kulas final voyage to Australia, for disassembly.  Rear Admiral Viliame Naupoto, the commanding officer of the Fiji Military Forces, spoke at the ceremony.  Naupoto had served aboard Kulas commissioning voyage in 1994. Kula departed for Australia on January 20, 2020.

Replacement

Australia started building 21 larger and more capable replacement vessels in 2017.  Fiji is scheduled to receive two new vessels.  will replace Kula is scheduled to be delivered in March 2020.

References

Ships of the Fijian Navy
Pacific Forum class patrol vessels
1994 ships